Croissy is part of the name of several communes of France:

 Croissy-Beaubourg, in the Seine-et-Marne département
 Croissy-sur-Seine, in the Yvelines département